Antoine Hoang (born 4 November 1995) is a French tennis player. He has a career high ATP singles ranking of World No. 98 achieved on 19 August 2019. He also has a career high ATP doubles ranking of No. 132 achieved on 18 October 2021.

Professional career

2018: ATP and Grand Slam doubles debut
Hoang made his ATP main draw debut at the 2018 Open 13 in the doubles draw partnering Alexandre Müller. He received a wild card for the main draw of the 2018 French Open in the doubles draw, partnering with Ugo Humbert.

2019: First ATP singles win and doubles final, Grand Slam and top 100 debut
He won his first ATP match in Montpellier against Steve Darcis in 2019 before losing to compatriot Jeremy Chardy and made the final in doubles, partnering Benjamin Bonzi.

On his Grand Slam singles debut at the 2019 French Open, Hoang reached the third round as a wildcard defeating 23rd seed Fernando Verdasco before losing to 14th seed compatriot Gael Monfils. He reached a career high ranking of World No. 98 on 19 August 2019. He also made his debut as a wildcard at the 2019 US Open (tennis) where he reached the second round defeating Leonardo Mayer in a five-set match before losing to 28th seed Nick Kyrgios.

2020-2021: French Open doubles third round, Wimbledon singles debut

At the 2020 French Open in doubles as a wildcard Hoang reached the third round for the first time in his career partnering Benjamin Bonzi where they were defeated by 8th seeded German duo and eventual champions from Germany Kevin Krawietz/Andreas Mies. He received a wildcard for the singles main draw as well.

Hoang qualified for the first time and reached the second round of the 2021 Wimbledon Championships on his debut where he defeated fellow qualifier Zhang Zhizhen in a five-set match before losing to Sebastian Korda.

Grand Slam singles performance timeline

ATP career finals

Doubles: 1 (1 runner-up)

Challenger and Futures finals

Singles: 19 (7 titles, 12 runner-ups)

Doubles: 35 (19 titles, 16 runner-ups)

Notes

References

External links
 
 

1995 births
Living people
French male tennis players
French people of Vietnamese descent
Sportspeople from Toulon
Sportspeople from Hyères